Dave Way is an American producer, mixer and audio engineer based in Los Angeles, California, United States. He has worked with Fiona Apple, Sheryl Crow, Kesha, Pink, Christina Aguilera, Macy Gray, Ringo Starr, Shakira, Phoebe Bridgers, John Doe, Savage Garden, Michael Jackson, Spice Girls, Norah Jones, Beck, Eric Clapton, Neil Young, Babyface, Ziggy Marley, Weird Al Yankovic, Paul McCartney, Mick Jagger, Stevie Wonder, Gwen Stefani, Chris Botti, Jakob Dylan, Andrew WK, Foo Fighters, TLC,  Guy, Toni Braxton, Boyz II Men, Kool Moe Dee, Heavy D. & The Boyz, Ayumi Hamasaki, Ronan Keating and many more. He is a four-time Grammy Award-winner as well as a songwriter and is co-writer of the number one single "I Like the Way (The Kissing Game)" by the group Hi-Five (1991).
He has mixed the score for the films Echo In The Canyon, Flag Day, Reminiscence, Stand Up Guys, as well as music for Sons of Anarchy, The Bastard Executioner, The Bodyguard, School Of Rock, Deepwater Horizon, True Blood, Forgetting Sarah Marshall, Superbad, 50 First Dates, Teen Titans Go To The Movies, Spider-Man, White Men Can't Jump and others.

Way, an alumnus of Berklee College of Music, works mainly at his own private Dolby Atmos equipped studio called Waystation Studio. He previously owned a commercial studio in Los Angeles, called The Pass Studios (formerly known as Larrabee East and Andora studios).

References

External links
Official Website
Brightman Music Management: Dave Way

Year of birth missing (living people)
Living people
Record producers from California
American audio engineers